Anna Marie "Patty" Duke (December 14, 1946 – March 29, 2016) was an American actress and mental health advocate. Over the course of her acting career, she was the recipient of an Academy Award, two Golden Globe Awards, three Primetime Emmy Awards, and a star on the Hollywood Walk of Fame.

At age 15, Duke portrayed Helen Keller in the film The Miracle Worker (1962), a role she had originated on Broadway. She won an Academy Award for Best Supporting Actress for her performance. The following year, she played the dual role of "identical cousins" Cathy and Patty Lane on her own network television series The Patty Duke Show (1963–1966). She progressed to more mature roles, such as Neely O'Hara in the film Valley of the Dolls (1967) and Natalie Miller in the film Me, Natalie (1969). The latter earned her a Golden Globe Award for Best Actress – Motion Picture Comedy or Musical. From 1985 to 1988, she served as president of the Screen Actors Guild.

Duke was diagnosed with bipolar disorder in 1982. Following her diagnosis, she devoted much of her time to advocating for and educating the public on mental health. She was also an occasional singer and author.

Early life
Duke was born at Bellevue Hospital in Manhattan. the youngest of three children of Frances Margaret (née McMahon), a cashier, and John Patrick Duke, a handyman and cab driver of Irish descent. She was raised Roman Catholic.

Duke spent her early life in the Elmhurst neighborhood of Queens, where her brother Raymond, her sister Carol, and she experienced a difficult childhood. Their father was an alcoholic, and their mother suffered from clinical depression and was prone to violence. When Duke was six, her mother forced her father to leave the family home. When Duke was eight, her care was turned over to talent managers John and Ethel Ross, who after promoting Patty's brother, were looking for a girl to add to their stable of child actors.

The Rosses' methods of managing Duke's career were often unscrupulous and exploitative. They consistently billed Duke as being two years younger than she actually was and padded her resume with false credits. They gave her alcohol and prescription drugs, took unreasonably high fees from her earnings, and made sexual advances to her. She never saw her father and saw her mother only when she visited to do the Rosses' laundry. In addition, the Rosses made Duke change her name. "Anna Marie is dead," they said. "You're Patty now." They hoped that Patty Duke would duplicate the success of Patty McCormack.

Career

Acting

1950s–1990s
One of Duke's early acting roles was in the late 1950s on the soap opera The Brighter Day. She also appeared in print ads and in television commercials. In 1959, at the age of 12, Duke was a contestant on The $64,000 Question and won $32,000; her category of expertise, according to her autobiography Call Me Anna, was popular music. The game show was revealed to have been rigged, and she was called to testify before a panel of the United States Senate. Duke eventually testified before congressional investigators and broke into tears when she admitted she had been coached to speak falsely.

Also in 1959, Duke appeared in a television adaptation of Meet Me in St. Louis as Tootie Smith, the role that had originated in the film version by Margaret O'Brien. Duke's first major starring role was Helen Keller (with Anne Bancroft as Anne Sullivan), in the Broadway play The Miracle Worker, which ran from October 1959 to July 1961. Duke originated the role of Keller on Broadway, although Patty McCormack actually originated the role in its earlier original presentation as a live television drama on Playhouse 90. During the run, Duke's name was elevated above the play's title on the theater's billboard, believed to be the first time this had been done for such a young star. The play was subsequently made into a 1962 film for which Duke received the Academy Award for Best Supporting Actress. Before the film started shooting, the actress and activist Helen Keller briefly met. At 16, Duke was the youngest person at that time to have received an Academy Award in a competitive category. Duke returned to television, this time starring with Laurence Olivier and George C. Scott in a television production of The Power and the Glory (1961).

Duke's own series, The Patty Duke Show, created by Sidney Sheldon especially for her, began airing in September 1963. At that time, Duke had not been diagnosed as having bipolar disorder, but Sheldon did notice that she had two distinct sides to her personality, so he developed the concept of identical cousins with contrasting personalities. Duke portrayed both main characters: Patricia "Patty" Lane, a fun-loving American teenager who occasionally got into trouble at school and home, and her prim and proper "identical cousin" from Scotland, Catherine "Cathy" Lane. William Schallert portrayed Patty's father, Martin, and his twin brother, Kenneth, Cathy's father; Jean Byron played her mother, Natalie; Paul O'Keefe was her younger brother, Ross; and Eddie Applegate portrayed her boyfriend, Richard Harrison (though the actor was several years Duke's senior). The show also featured such high-profile guest stars as Sammy Davis, Jr., Peter Lawford, Paul Lynde, and Sal Mineo. The series lasted three seasons and earned Duke an Emmy Award nomination. In 1999, the program's characters were revisited and updated in The Patty Duke Show: Still Rockin' in Brooklyn Heights, with Cindy Williams taking on the villain role of Sue Ellen Turner when Kitty Sullivan was unable to reprise her role.

After the cancellation of The Patty Duke Show in 1966, Duke began her adult acting career by playing Neely O'Hara in Valley of the Dolls (1967). The film was a box-office success, but audiences and critics had a difficult time accepting all-American-teenager Duke as an alcoholic, drug-addicted singing star. While the film has since become a camp classic—thanks in large part to Duke's over-the-top performance—at the time it almost ruined her career. In 1969, Duke starred in Me, Natalie, in which she played an "ugly duckling" Brooklyn teenager struggling to make a life for herself in the Bohemian world of Greenwich Village. Duke won the Golden Globe Award for Best Actress (Musical or Comedy) for the role.

Duke returned to television in 1970, starring in a made-for-TV movie, My Sweet Charlie. Her portrayal of a pregnant teenager on the run won Duke her first Emmy Award. Her acceptance speech was rambling and disjointed, leading many in the industry to believe she was drunk or using drugs at the time. In fact, Duke was experiencing a manic phase of her bipolar disorder, which remained undiagnosed until 1982. She received her second Emmy in 1977 for the TV miniseries Captains and the Kings and her third in 1980 for a TV version of her 1979 stage revival of The Miracle Worker, this time playing Anne Sullivan to Melissa Gilbert's Helen Keller. Her turns in the made-for-TV movies The Women's Room (1980) and George Washington (1984) both garnered her Emmy nominations. In the 1980s, Duke was cast in a number of short-lived TV series. The ABC sitcom It Takes Two, from Soap and Benson creator Susan Harris, was cancelled after one season; Hail to the Chief, in which she appeared as the first female President of the United States; and a comedy, Karen's Song, which aired on the fledgling Fox network.

Duke's film roles in the 1980s included the Canadian film By Design (1981), which garnered her a Genie Award nomination for Best Foreign Actress, and the made-for-TV movie A Time to Triumph (1986), the true story of Concetta Hassan, a woman who struggles to support her family after her husband is injured, but who eventually becomes a United States Army helicopter pilot. In 1990, Duke's autobiography, Call Me Anna, was adapted for television; she played herself from her mid-30s onward. In 1992, Duke portrayed the mother of Meg Ryan's character in the film adaptation of the play Prelude to a Kiss. Duke received an Emmy nomination in 1999 for her appearances in three episodes of Touched by an Angel.

In 1985, Duke became the second woman, after Kathleen Nolan, to be elected president of the Screen Actors Guild, a post she held until 1988. Her tenure as president was marked by factional in-fighting and controversy; however, she gained respect for managing to maintain solidarity among the guild's members. During her term, she led industrial actions and contract negotiations and oversaw the relocation of the guild's headquarters.

Later years
Duke gradually reduced her work schedule in the 2000s but took occasional TV roles, including guest appearances on shows such as Glee and the reboot of Hawaii Five-0. In 2011, she joined the cast of the drama The Protector. She also returned to the stage on occasion—in 2002 as Aunt Eller in a revival of Oklahoma! on Broadway and in 2009 as Madame Morrible in the San Francisco production of the musical Wicked. In May 2011, Duke directed the stage version of The Miracle Worker at the now defunct Interplayers Theater in Spokane, Washington. In 2010, she hosted a PBS TV special When Irish Eyes Are Smiling: An Irish Parade Of Stars. The special was part of the My Music series and featured Irish and Irish-American folk music and sentimental standards.

In 2011, Duke appeared in public service announcements for the U.S. government, promoting the Social Security website. In several, she appeared as Patty and Cathy using split-screen effects. In others, she appeared with George Takei wearing a Star Trek-like costume. In 2015, Duke made her final TV appearance, guest-starring on Liv and Maddie as Grandma Janice and Great-aunt Hilary, a pair of identical twins.

Singing
Like many teen stars of the era, and bolstered somewhat by her appearance in the musical Billie, Duke had a successful singing career, including two top-40 hits in 1965, "Don't Just Stand There" (number eight) and "Say Something Funny" (number 22). She also performed on TV shows such as The Ed Sullivan Show.

Mental health advocacy
In 1987, Duke revealed in her autobiography that she had been diagnosed with manic depression (now called bipolar disorder) in 1982, becoming one of the first public figures to speak out about her personal experience of mental illness. She also suffered from anorexia nervosa and during her teenaged years, weighed as little as 76 pounds. She attempted suicide in 1967 and was again hospitalized for mental health problems in 1969, eventually being diagnosed as manic depressive in 1982. Her treatment, which included the use of lithium as medication and therapy, successfully stabilized her moods. She subsequently became an activist for mental health causes. She lobbied the United States Congress and joined forces with the National Institute of Mental Health and the National Alliance on Mental Illness to increase awareness, funding, and research for people with mental illness. In 2007, Duke appeared on The Oprah Winfrey Show, talking about her bipolar disorder.

Memoirs
Duke wrote three books. Her autobiography, Call Me Anna was published in 1987 and Brilliant Madness: Living with Manic Depressive Illness was published in 1992.
The third, In The Presence of Greatness—My Sixty Year Journey as an Actress (with William J. Jankowski), published posthumously in February 2018, is a collection of essays about her experiences with other artists and celebrities.

Recognition
Over the course of her career, Duke received an Academy Award for Best Supporting Actress, three Emmy Awards in 10 nominations, and two Golden Globe Awards amongst four nominations. In 1963, when she won her Academy Award, Duke became the youngest person to ever win an Academy Award in a competitive category.

On August 17, 2004, Duke received a star on the Hollywood Walk of Fame for her contribution to the motion-picture industry. On December 14, 2007, her 61st birthday, Duke was awarded an honorary doctorate in humane letters degree from the University of North Florida for her work in advancing awareness of mental health issues. On March 6, 2010, she was awarded an honorary doctorate in humane letters degree from the University of Maryland Eastern Shore.

Personal life
Duke was married four times and had three children. A Catholic, Duke had dreams of becoming a nun in her youth. In her later life, she studied a number of different religions, commenting in 1995: "To suggest that one must spout Moses or Jesus or Buddha or chant like Tibetan monks in order to be religious, I believe, is not to walk in the path of Christ... I have been a Christian Scientist. If there's a religious definition of `dabbler,' I guess that would be me. I have studied Buddhism. There was a time when I very seriously considered Judaism. And, yes, I do go to church now. I go to a Unity Church. I also go to Catholic church occasionally because the child in me desperately needs the bells and smells."
  
In 1965, Duke married director Harry Falk, who was 13 years her senior. It led to the end of Duke's relationship with her childhood guardians, the Rosses. During their marriage, she had repeated mood swings, drank heavily, became anorexic, and overdosed on pills a number of times. The couple divorced in 1969.

In early 1970, at the age of 23, Duke became involved with three men at the same time — 17-year-old Here's Lucy star Desi Arnaz Jr., actor John Astin, who was 16 years her senior, and rock music promoter Michael Tell. The relationship with Arnaz was widely publicized, due in part to the vocal and public opposition of Arnaz's mother, actress and production company executive Lucille Ball. By late spring, Duke and Arnaz had broken off their relationship.

In June 1970, Duke learned that she was pregnant; she then married Michael Tell on June 26, 1970, during a manic phase, to "give (her child) a name." Their marriage lasted 13 days before ending in an annulment on July 9, 1970; Her son, actor Sean Astin, was born on February 25, 1971. In 1985, she told Sean that Arnaz Jr. was Sean's biological father. Duke said in her 1987 autobiography that the marriage to Tell was never consummated and that Astin was the actual biological father of Sean. Several chapters in her book emphasized these assertions about her relationship with Tell and the paternity of her son. It turned out that all three statements were incorrect: in 1994, when her son Sean underwent biological testing to determine his real paternity, the results showed that Tell was his biological father.

Duke married John Astin on August 5, 1972. Astin adopted Sean and the couple had a son, actor Mackenzie Astin. Duke and Astin worked together extensively during their marriage, and she took his name professionally, becoming "Patty Duke Astin". During this period, Duke underwent a hysterectomy. Duke adopted Astin's three sons, and years later in 1998, Astin's sons reversed the adoption with Duke's approval. The couple divorced in 1985.

Duke married her fourth husband, drill sergeant Michael Pearce, in 1986, and remained married to him until her death 30 years later. Duke and Pearce had met during the production of A Time to Triumph, for which Pearce served as a consultant. The couple moved to Hayden, Idaho, and adopted a son, Kevin, who was born in 1988. From her marriage to Pearce until her death in 2016, Duke occasionally used the name "Anna Duke-Pearce" in her writings and other professional work.

Duke had three granddaughters by her eldest son Sean, actresses Alexandra, Elizabeth, and Isabella.

Death
Duke died on the morning of March 29, 2016, in Coeur d'Alene, Idaho, of sepsis from a ruptured intestine at the age of 69. Her son Sean Astin invited the public to contribute to a mental health foundation in his mother's name, the Patty Duke Mental Health Initiative. She was cremated and her ashes were interred at Forest Cemetery in Coeur d'Alene.

Filmography

Films

Television

Awards and nominations

Discography

Albums

Singles

See also 
 List of oldest and youngest Academy Award winners and nominees

References

Further reading 
 Duke, Patty; Kennen Turan (1987). Call Me Anna: The Autobiography of Patty Duke. Bantam Books. p. 231. .

External links

 
 
 
 Patty Duke Death

1946 births
2016 deaths
20th-century American actresses
21st-century American actresses
Activists from New York (state)
Actresses from New York City
American child actresses
American film actresses
American memoirists
American people of German descent
American people of Irish descent
American stage actresses
American television actresses
American women memoirists
American women pop singers
Audiobook narrators
Catholics from New York (state)
Deaths from sepsis
Best Musical or Comedy Actress Golden Globe (film) winners
Best Supporting Actress Academy Award winners
Infectious disease deaths in Idaho
American trade union leaders
New Star of the Year (Actress) Golden Globe winners
Outstanding Performance by a Lead Actress in a Miniseries or Movie Primetime Emmy Award winners
People from Elmhurst, Queens
People from Hayden, Idaho
People with bipolar disorder
Presidents of the Screen Actors Guild
Writers from Queens, New York